This article lists the leaders of administrative divisions of East Germany, officially the German Democratic Republic (GDR;). GDR was a country that existed from 1949 to 1990, when the eastern portion of Germany was part of the Eastern Bloc during the Cold War.

Until 1952, GDR was divided into 5 states, from north to south: Mecklenburg, Brandenburg, Saxony-Anhalt, Saxony and Thuringia.

From 1952 until 1990, GDR was divided into 14 districts, each named after their capitals, from north to south: Rostock, Neubrandenburg, Schwerin, Potsdam, Frankfurt, Magdeburg, Cottbus, Halle, Leipzig, Erfurt, Dresden, Karl-Marx-Stadt (named Chemnitz until the 1953 Karl Marx Year), Gera and Suhl.

Due to its special status, East Berlin was originally not counted as a Bezirk. In 1961, after the Berlin Crisis of 1961 and the construction of the Berlin Wall, East Berlin came to be recognised in GDR administration as the Bezirk Berlin, though it retained a special status until the adoption of the revised 1968 Constitution.

Officeholders

States (Länder)

Mecklenburg

Party leaders

State leaders

Brandenburg

Party leader

State leaders

Saxony-Anhalt

Party leaders

State leaders

Saxony

Party leaders

State leaders

Thuringia

Party leaders

State leaders

Districts (Bezirke)

Rostock

Party leaders

District leaders

Neubrandenburg

Party leaders

District leaders

Schwerin

Party leaders

District leaders

Potsdam

Party leaders

District leaders

Frankfurt

Party leaders

District leaders

Magdeburg

Party leaders

District leaders

Cottbus

Party leaders

District leaders

Halle

Party leaders

District leaders

Leipzig

Party leaders

District leaders

Erfurt

Party leaders

District leaders

Dresden

Party leaders

District leaders

Karl-Marx-Stadt

Party leaders

District leaders

Gera

Party leaders

District leaders

Suhl

Party leaders

District leaders

East Berlin

Party leaders

District leaders

See also

Politics of East Germany
Leadership of East Germany
States of Germany
Districts of Germany

Notes

References

External links
Worldstatesmen.org – States of Germany since 1918 and Districts of East Germany

 
Politics of East Germany
East Germany district leaders
Leaders of administrative divisions